Self-Portrait as Saint Catherine of Alexandria is a 1615–1617 painting by the Italian Baroque artist Artemisia Gentileschi, showing the artist in the guise of Catherine of Alexandria. It is now in the collection of the National Gallery, London, which purchased it in 2018 for £3.6 million, including about £2.7 million from its American Friends group.

It was painted during Gentileschi's  time in Florence, and is similar to her Saint Catherine of Alexandria (c. 1619), now in the Uffizi Gallery. It is one of several paintings of female martyrs by Gentileschi that she made after her famous 1612 rape trial, in which she (unlike the accused) was subject to torture to test the veracity of her testimony.

Description 
The figure is shown in three-quarter view with a broken spiked wheel; according to tradition this was the instrument of torture to which Saint Catherine of Alexandria was subjected before being beheaded. The palm frond she holds in her other hand was also a traditional symbol of martyrdom. The crown she wears under the headscarf suggests her royal status, however along with the halo it is believed to have been added a later date. Current research on the contemporaneous works Artemisia created suggests that this piece began as a self-portrait and was later modified to depict the saint.

Provenance 
The original owner of Gentileschi's Self-Portrait as Saint Catherine is unknown, and nothing is recorded of its whereabouts until the early 1940s when the painting was bequeathed by Charles Marie Boudeville to his son. The painting remained in the Boudeville private collection until it was sold at Hôtel Drouot in Paris on 19 December 2017 for €2.4m. The €1.9m hammer price was well above the original estimate of €300,000–€400,000.

It was acquired by London-based dealers Robilant+Voena, and surpassed the 2014 Gentileschi record price record for her Mary Magdalene in Ecstasy. In July 2018, the National Gallery in London announced that it had purchased the painting from the dealers for £3.6 million (US$4.7 million). It is the first painting by a woman artist acquired by the National Gallery since 1991, when five paintings by Paula Rego were donated to the museum. On acquiring it, the National Gallery executed restoration on the painting.

Other self-portraits by Artemisia Gentileschi

Notes

References

Books and articles about Gentileschi

 Locker, Jesse. Artemisia Gentileschi: The Language of Painting. New Haven: Yale University Press, 2015.
 Barker, Sheila, Artemisia Gentileschi in a Changing Light. Turnhout: Harvey Miller, 2017
 Bal, Meike, Mary Garrard, and Nanette Salomon. The Artemisia Files: Artemisia Gentileschi for Feminists and Other Thinking People. Chicago: University of Chicago Press, 2006

Media 

 Javier Pes. "The National Gallery’s New Artemisia Gentileschi Should Be a Triumph—But Clouds Are Forming Over Its Ownership During WWII." Art News. 6 July 2018.
 Jonathan Jones. "National Gallery buys Artemisia Gentileschi masterpiece for £3.6m." The Guardian. 6 July 2018.
 Naomi Rea, "Newly Discovered Drawings Beneath a Work by Artemisia Gentileschi Suggest She Often Used Herself as a Model." Art News. 7 March 2019.

Gentileschi
17th-century portraits
1617 paintings
Paintings by Artemisia Gentileschi
Collections of the National Gallery, London
Paintings of Catherine of Alexandria